Bezalel was the chief artisan of the Tabernacle, as described in the Book of Exodus.

Bezalel may also refer to:

People
Bezalel Ashkenazi (ca. 1520 – ca. 1592), rabbi and talmudist in 16th century Ottoman Palestine 
Bezalel Narkiss (1926–2008), Israeli art historian
Bezalel Rakow (1927 – 2003), Orthodox rabbi in Gateshead, England
Bezalel ben Joel Ronsburg (1760 – 1820), Bohemian Talmudist and rabbi, dayan and head of the yeshiva in Prague
Hezi Bezalel (born 1951), Israeli businessman
Judah Loew ben Bezalel (1520 – 1609), rabbi also known as the Maharal of Prague
Bezalel Smotrich (b. 1980), Israeli politician

Other uses
Bezalel Academy of Arts and Design, an academic college of design and art located in Jerusalem, Israel
Bezalel school, an art movement in Palestine in the late Ottoman and British Mandate periods

See also
Bezaliel, an angel mentioned in the Book of Enoch